Fastrack is a bus rapid transit scheme in the Thames Gateway area of Kent. It consists of three routes, operated by Arriva Southern Counties on behalf of Kent County Council with Prologis and Amazon respectively. Measures used to allow buses to avoid traffic include signal priority, reserved lanes, and dedicated busways.

Routes

Construction work on Fastrack started on Thursday, 23 September 2004, and it began operating with the introduction of Fastrack B on Sunday, 26 March 2006 between Temple Hill and Gravesend, serving Darent Valley Hospital, Bluewater Shopping Centre, Greenhithe station (and Ebbsfleet International station since it opened on Monday, 19 November 2007). Services operate from 05:30 until after midnight.

The 9.5 km (5.9 mi) long Fastrack A was added on Sunday, 3 June 2007. It operates up to every ten minutes between Dartford and Bluewater along the western side of Temple Hill, The Bridge Crossways Business Park and Greenhithe station. Fastrack A is part-funded by Prologis, the developers of The Bridge.

On Monday, 23 August 2021 the 24-hour route AZ was added to the network serving the new Amazon LCY3 distribution centre in Dartford. The route was initially operated by Go-Coach using Alexander Dennis Enviro400 vehicles, up to every 15 minutes, 24 hours a day. On Sunday, 3 April 2022, route AZ was modified to only run at shift changeover times at the LCY3 centre and at the same time, was transferred to Arriva Kent Thameside.

Current Routes

Route changes
When Fastrack B began it was divided into five fare zones. They were replaced with the current three zones when Fastrack A began to simplify the fare structure and to ease the introduction of off-vehicle ticket machines.

Prior to the opening of Ebbsfleet International on Monday, 19 November 2007, Fastrack B ran through Northfleet. The diversion along Thames Way to the station, connecting with Eurostar and Southeastern High Speed services, added 2 km (1¼ mi) of junction priority and segregated lanes. Northfleet is still served by conventional Arriva routes 480 and 490.

For the first four months of operation, Route A ran on a temporary alignment via Junction 1a of the M25 motorway to link The Bridge, Dartford, development site with Crossways Business Park. From Sunday, 30 September 2007 it was diverted via a dedicated bridge over the Dartford toll plaza and under the QE2 Bridge of the Dartford Crossing, avoiding a congestion hotspot and allowing the original six-minute peak frequency to be improved to five minutes.

On Monday, 10 December 2012 the Everards Link Phase 2, which links Greenhithe station with the Ingress Park housing development via a stretch of busway, opened.

From Sunday, 2 September 2018 Fastrack B was rerouted within Ingress Park to serve the whole of the development following the completion of a new section of road linking the development with London Road.

From Sunday, 3 April 2022, Fastrack A was rerouted within Dartford to serve the Amazon LCY3 distribution centre, in place of Fastrack AZ which was modified to only operate at shift changeover times. A 24 hour service was introduced on Fastrack A at the same time, running between Dartford and Greenhithe Station.

Fares and ticketing
The network is split into three fare zones. Tickets are sold by the driver and from roadside machines, at certain bus stops, to allow for faster boarding.

M-tickets, bus tickets on mobile phones, were successfully trialled on Monday, 11 February 2008 and are now available across the Arriva bus network.

Vehicles
The original fleet consisted of 26 Wright Eclipse Urban bodied Volvo B7RLEs. These had audio-visual next stop announcements, air conditioning and CCTV. On Sunday, 9 August 2015, these were replaced by 21 Wright StreetLites.

From Wednesday, 21 March to Wednesday, 9 May 2018 Fastrack took part in a trial scheme which saw an additional hourly journey made by an electric Volvo 7900e, with a main charging point installed in the form of a generator at the front of Greenhithe railway station allowing the bus to fully charge inside six minutes.

On Sunday, 4 August 2019 Arriva Kent Thameside retained the contract to operate the Fastrack B service. As part of this, the 14 Wright StreetLites on the route were replaced with newer Alexander Dennis Enviro200 MMC vehicles transferred from the Medway area which were refurbished to Fastrack specification. 7 of the Wright StreetLites continue to operate on Fastrack A.

Between Monday, 23 August 2021 and Sunday, 3 April 2022, whilst the Fastrack AZ service was operated by Go-Coach, a total of eight Alexander Dennis Enviro400 vehicles worked on the service. When this route was transferred to Arriva Kent Thameside, the Enviro400 vehicles were withdrawn from the network and three additional Enviro200 MMC now work on the AZ service.

Dover
A further Fastrack system is under construction in Dover and Whitfield.

See also
 List of guided busways and BRT systems in the United Kingdom
 Crawley Fastway, a similar-sized guided system

References

External links
 
 Fastrack website

Arriva Group bus operators in England
Bus transport brands
Guided busways and BRT systems in the United Kingdom
Transport in Kent
2006 establishments in England